Euzophera mercatrix is a species of snout moth in the genus Euzophera. It was described by Edward Meyrick in 1937 and is known from Iraq.

References

Moths described in 1937
Phycitini
Moths of Asia